Mattias Ottosson (born 1971) is a Swedish politician.  he serves as Member of the Riksdag representing the constituency of Östergötland County.

References 

Living people
1971 births
Place of birth missing (living people)
21st-century Swedish politicians
Members of the Riksdag 2014–2018
Members of the Riksdag 2018–2022
Members of the Riksdag 2022–2026
Members of the Riksdag from the Social Democrats